Queer as Folk is a drama television series. An American–Canadian co-production. The series ran between December 2000 and August 2005 and was produced for Showtime and Showcase by Cowlip Productions, Tony Jonas Productions, Temple Street Productions and Showtime Networks in association with Crowe Entertainment. It was developed and written by Ron Cowen and Daniel Lipman, who were the showrunners, and also the executive producers along with Tony Jonas, former President of Warner Bros. Television.

The series was based on the British series created by Russell T Davies. Although it was set in Pittsburgh, PA, much of the series was actually shot in Toronto and employed various Canadian directors known for their independent film work (including Bruce McDonald, David Wellington, Kelly Makin, John Greyson, Jeremy Podeswa and Michael DeCarlo) as well as Australian director Russell Mulcahy, who directed the pilot episode. Additional writers in the later seasons included Michael MacLennan, Efrem Seeger, Brad Fraser, Del Shores, and Shawn Postoff.

Series overview

Episodes

Season 1 (2000–01)

 In the United States, the first episode aired #1 and #2 back-to-back. In Canada, the first episode consisted of #1-#3.

Season 2 (2002)

Season 3 (2003)

Season 4 (2004)

Season 5 (2005)

 In the United States, the season premiere consisted of episodes #1 and #2.

External links

References

Lists of comedy-drama television series episodes
Lists of American comedy-drama television series episodes
Episodes
Lists of American LGBT-related television series episodes